The Break Up Notebook is a musical with music and lyrics by Lori Scarlett and David Manning and a book by Patricia Cotter. Cotter also wrote the play the musical was based on.

The Break Up Notebook tells the story of Helen Hill, a thirty-three-year-old lesbian from Los Angeles. Having just been dumped, she begins dating again with the support of her gay friend Bob and her butch and femme gal pals Monica and Joanie.

Original cast 
Helen Hill .... Heidi Godt
Casey/Sheila .... Christine Lakin
Bob/Helen's father .... Patrick Bristow
Monica .... Melody Butiu
Joanie .... Jacqueline Maloney
Frances .... Whitney Allen 
New Yorker, Ensemble .... Lori Scarlett 
Two Stepper, Mystery Woman, Ensemble .... Kara Maguire 
Bad Perm, Ensemble, Ex-Girlfriend .... Jodi Dominick 
Mom, Mistress Tammi, Saleswoman, Ensemble .... Deb Snyder 
Club Patron, Ensemble .... Amy Reiss
Ensemble Swing.... Lauren Stone

The Break Up Notebook premiered at Hudson Theatre in Santa Monica (December 10, 2005 - March 12, 2006) and was performed at the Diversionary Theatre in San Diego (July 17, 2007 - August 17, 2007).  It was produced by Rose Marcario in association with the L.A. Gay and Lesbian Center.

Awards
The Break Up Notebook was winner of the Ovation Award for best new musical, six Garland Awards, and the L.A. Drama Critics Award for Best Score. It was also one of the musicals the National Alliance for Musical Theatre chose to feature at their 2007 Festival of New Musicals.

References

Broadway World

External links 
Musical Score Award
Variety.com
Ovation Awards

2005 musicals
LGBT-related musicals